Barney Rogan,  Bernard Rogan, was a film editor in the 1920–1940 era.

Filmography
1940 	A Miracle on Main Street
1933 	Hotel Variety
1931 	The Struggle
1931 	Tarnished Lady
1931 	The Girl Habit
1930 	Queen High
1930 	Follow the Leader
1929 	The Cocoanuts

References

Year of birth missing
Year of death missing
American film editors